Ardon is a former townsite and unincorporated community in Muscatine County, Iowa, United States. It is located at the intersection of 250th Street and Jasper Avenue, four miles east of Cranston, at 41.366543N, -94.317809W.

History
Ardon was a rail town built in the late 1800s. Once home to livery stables, a hotel, a railroad depot, and around 70 residents, the rail line was later moved. The railroad station was moved two miles west. Only the Ardon rail sign, St. Malachy's Catholic Church and graveyard, and a few scattered houses remain. St. Malachy's Church was constructed in 1902 next to the railroad and desanctified in 1991. The graveyard lies a half mile south of the church.

Ardon's population was 42 in 1925.

References

Further reading
Healey, Howard A. (1979). Ardon, 1901-1954: History of a Small Town in "76" Township, Muscatine Co. Iowa.

Unincorporated communities in Muscatine County, Iowa
Unincorporated communities in Iowa